Chris Rowney (born 14 February 1991) is an English professional footballer who plays as a midfielder.

Career
Rowney made his debut on 1 September 2009 for Oldham Athletic in their 2–1 home defeat to Accrington Stanley in the Football League Trophy, replacing Andy Holdsworth in the 62nd minute as a substitute.

He was one of six players released by Oldham at the end of his contract in June 2010. Rowney then went on to sign for Mossley later that same month. Mossley manager, Shaun Higgins commented on Rowney after he signed stating; "Chris is a very talented young player. Several offers came his way but he has chosen a different path for now and we are delighted that he has agreed to sign for us."

After a season with Mossley, Rowney moved to Woodley Sports in August 2011 but returned to Mossley in August 2012.

In 2013, he joined Curzon Ashton.

References

External links
Oldham Athletic profile
Mossley profile

Living people
1991 births
English footballers
Oldham Athletic A.F.C. players
Mossley A.F.C. players
English Football League players
Stockport Sports F.C. players
Footballers from Manchester
Association football midfielders
Curzon Ashton F.C. players
Ashton United F.C. players
Bury A.F.C. players